The Niagara Square was a shopping centre and former mall in Niagara Falls, Ontario, Canada. The Niagara Square opened in 1977. The interior of the shopping centre was closed in 2017, while some stores remained open in the exterior. Before its closure, the Niagara Square was a  shopping centre with 83 units. Before the demolition of the shopping centre, more than 30% of the tenants occupying the space had left prior to its closure.  In 2019, the property began its redevelopment and as of December 2020, the majority of the original interior mall has been demolished, with the exterior businesses open and intact.

History 
In January 2007, The Bay location at Niagara Square closed and left 100,000 square feet of vacant space. In April 2007, the marketing director for the mall, Tammy Robertson, announced that a Mandarin Restaurant, Michaels crafts store and a JYSK furniture store would open within this space.

In April 2017, the shopping centre closed. Demolition of the interior began in the spring of 2019. Two banks that were previously located within the interior, BMO and CIBC, relocated into the mall's outbuildings. The co-owners of the property, Bayfield Realty Advisors and LioCan Real Estate Investment Trust Co., invested 25 million dollars into the demolition and revdevelopment of Niagara Square. Bayfield Realty Advisors met with Jim Diodati (the mayor of Niagara Falls) and city staff to discuss redevelopment. Costco, a warehouse retail outlet, selected the property as their next store location. The store opened on November 13, 2020. The cost for construction has not been specified, but the Bayfield company has included it as part of their multi-million dollar investment to redevelop the property. In total, the Costco store is 150,000 square feet. The interior of the shopping centre has been demolished, and is planned as parking lot space. The store itself is located along the back of the property.

References 

Defunct shopping malls in Canada
Shopping malls established in 1977
Shopping malls disestablished in 2017
1977 establishments in Ontario
2017 disestablishments in Ontario
Buildings and structures demolished in 2019
Buildings and structures in Niagara Falls, Ontario